Monema tanaognatha is a moth of the family Limacodidae. It is found in China (Shaanxi, Gansu, Hubei, Guangxi, Sichuan, Yunnan).

The wingspan is 28–33 mm. The ground colour of the forewings is yellow, with two dark concave fasciae from the apex to one-third and two-thirds of the inner margin. The distal part of the forewings is bordered by brown proximal fascia. The hindwings are yellow to yellowish brown.

Etymology
The species name is derived from Greek Tanaos (meaning long) and gnathos (meaning jaw) and refers to the long gnathos in the male genitalia.

References

Moths described in 2013
Limacodidae
Moths of Asia